The Catalana,  or , is a Spanish breed of domestic chicken. It originates in the area of El Prat de Llobregat in the comarca of Baix Llobregat, in Catalonia in eastern Spain. It may also be called the Catalana del Prat Leonada or Buff Catalana for its golden plumage. The Catalana is a hardy dual-purpose breed kept for both eggs and meat.

The Catalana was included in the Standard of Perfection of the American Poultry Association in 1949.

References

Conservation Priority Breeds of the Livestock Conservancy
Chicken breeds
Chicken breeds originating in Spain